Abdel Kader Belghiti (born 1937) is a Moroccan boxer. He competed in the men's flyweight event at the 1960 Summer Olympics. At the 1960 Summer Olympics, he lost to Rocky Gattellari of Australia.

References

1937 births
Living people
Moroccan male boxers
Olympic boxers of Morocco
Boxers at the 1960 Summer Olympics
People from Meknes
Flyweight boxers